An election to Merthyr Tydfil County Borough Council took place on 5 May 2022 as part of the 2022 Welsh local elections.

Independents lost the council to no overall control.

Results

References 

Merthyr Tydfil County Borough Council elections
2022 Welsh local elections